The Southwestern Power Administration (Southwestern) is an agency of the U.S. Department of Energy.  Southwestern's mission was established by Section 5 of the Flood Control Act of 1944. The agency is a power marketing administration responsible for marketing the hydroelectric power produced at 24 United States Army Corps of Engineers multipurpose dams.  By law, the power and associated energy are marketed to publicly held entities such as rural electric cooperatives and municipal utilities.  Southwestern has over one hundred such "preference" customers which ultimately serve over 10 million end use customers.

Southwestern operates and maintains 1,380 miles of high-voltage transmission lines, 24 substations, and 46 microwave and VHF radio sites from field offices.  Around-the-clock power scheduling and dispatching is conducted from the Operations Center.

Southwestern's rates, by law, are designed to recover the costs of producing the power.  These costs include repayment of the dams' initial construction, with interest; repayment of the transmission system construction, with interest; major replacements; and both the Corps of Engineers' and Southwestern's annual operating and maintenance expenses.  Annual revenues vary with water conditions, but generally average about US$100 million.  Southwestern returns the revenues to the U.S. Treasury, and of that, about US$40 million is applied toward interest and repayment of the Federal investment.

History

Speaker of the House Sam Rayburn of Texas and Representative Clyde T. Ellis of Arkansas spearheaded the effort to make all federal dams constructed by the U.S. Army Corps of Engineers in the region to stay owned and operated by the military while the hydroelectric power stations were to be managed and marketed by the new Southwestern Power Administration. In the late 1930s Rayburn and Ellis were able to secure dams in Denison, TX and Norfork, AR in separate independent projects for their House district constituents. The two representatives pushed for a 'mini-Tennessee Valley Authority' system for the states of Texas, Arkansas, Oklahoma, and Missouri (and a few more states who would be customers to these dams' energy production) but only for the federally-built dams and their hydroelectric power plants. Other power plants like fossil fuel plants were not going to be owned and managed by the SWPA like Tennessee's power plants. The reason for the creation of the SWPA was the fear that the federal dams, which are multipurpose in terms of flood control and water storage for recreation and human use, would be poorly managed by private businesses and also because utility companies during the 1920s and 1930s hiked up electricity prices in rural areas far higher than in urban areas.

The SWPA was a hallmark of Rayburn's campaign to provide electricity to all farmers and rural Americans. He previously succeeded in the landmark Rural Electrification Act of 1936 to establish rural cooperatives to supply very cheap electricity to rural Americans. The SWPA (as well as the establishment of the other three Power Marketing Administrations) and the guaranteed cheap electricity from dams helped the REA's goals to be realized. Rayburn first persuaded President Roosevelt to sign an executive order establishing the SWPA in July 1943. This was crucial because private utility companies were hoping for the dams to be turned over to the Federal Works Administration during World War II. Most public projects that were turned over to the FWA were scheduled to end up in private companies' hands after the war. Executive orders are only temporary so Rayburn was able to get the SWPA to be permanently established in the Flood Control Act of 1944. This act also established the similar Southeastern Power Administration. From 1943 to 1984 twenty-four dams were built for the SWPA.

List of dams

Photo Gallery

External links
 
 Southwestern Power Administration in the Federal Register

References

Public utilities of the United States
United States Department of Energy